Avni Rustemi (22 September 1895 – 22 April 1924) was an Albanian patriot, militant, teacher, activist and member of the Albanian parliament. Rustemi was the leader of both democratic organisations "Atdheu" and "Bashkimi", and also a member of the democratic opposition in the Albanian National Assembly preceding the Revolution of June 1924. He is also known for assassinating Essad Pasha Toptani.

Early life
Rustemi was born in Libohovë, in a patriotic family of landowners with ancient progressive traditions who were born into the Bektashi faith. He attended secondary school in Janina (Ioannina) and Istanbul. In 1908, at only 13 years of age, he abandoned school to join the guerrilla group of Çerçiz Topulli and in 1910 he attempted the assassination of the Ottoman army general of expedition, Turgut Pasha in Shkodër. In 1912-13, he studied at a teacher training college in Geneva and returned to Albania in 1914 where he served as a volunteer fighter against the Greek chauvinist forces in southern Albania during the Occupation of Albania (1912–1913). In 1915, he studied at a Jewish school in Janina (Ioannina) run by the Alliance Israélite Universelle. In 1917 he taught school in Tepelenë and Vlorë, and then in early 1919, Rustemi began further studies at the Arberesh College of Saint Adrian in San Demetrio Corone in Calabria. In the spring of 1919 in San Demetrio Corone, he formed the League of the Albanian Youth for the defence of the Albanian nation. After a stay in Rome, he returned to Vlorë in the spring of 1920 and to the political chaos reigning in Albania. It was there, after contact with certain individuals who were no doubt supporters of those in power, that he was encouraged to assassinate Essad Pasha Toptani, who was scheming to overthrow the new and unstable government. Essad Pasha was regarded as a traitor for having murdered Hasan Riza Pasha, commander of Shkodër, in April 1913, and for turning the fortress of Shkodër over to Montenegro.

Assassination of Essad Pasha
Essad Pasha was in Berlin and was hoping to return to Albania at the head of a new government or, indeed, as the country's monarch. On 21 May 1920, Avni Rustemi travelled to Rome and continued from there to Paris, pursuant to his instructions. Three weeks later, on 13 June 1920, he shot and killed Essad Pasha Toptani, who was leaving the Hotel Continental in Paris.

Albanian historians characteristically give lofty patriotic motives for the spectacular deed, which caught the attention of the French and European press. Rustemi was acquitted of the crime before a French court on 2 December 1920. The assassination was largely seen as a heroic act, as it has historically been seen as a signal of a new bourgeois and a peasant revolution against the feudal traditions of Albania and a crossing bridge in the newly democratic-petite bourgeois values.

Political career
On his return to Albania later that month, he was lauded as a national hero and entered the political arena. In April 1921, he took part in the founding in Vlora of the Atdheu (Fatherland) society and, when he founded Bashkimi (Unity) society on 13 October 1923, Rustemi was chosen for parliament with the support of Bajram Curri as deputy of HASI and came to lead the democratic forces of Fan Noli, Bajram Curri and Sulejman Delvina in an increasingly-bitter struggle with the conservative landowners under Ahmet Zogu. On 23 February 1924, Rustemi was involved in an attempt to assassinate Zogu.

Death

On April 20, 1924, he was shot in Durrës Road in Tirana by a miller called Jusuf Reçi, a loyal  subject to the Toptani family, and died two days later of his wounds. His widely attended funeral in Vlora on 30 April gave rise to the anti-government demonstrations that led to the Noli Revolution and the short lived rise to power of Fan Noli in June 1924.

Ideology
Avni Rustemi was an eminent democratic activist and ideologist. His ideology, expressed through different forms of speeches and journalism, became a strong weapon for the democratic Albanian youth. He claimed that "when the government does not fulfill the needs of the people, then this need must be fulfilled with the organised interest of people to push government to do so.'" For the solution to the country's crisis, he pointed at the development of the independent national economy. He is quoted saying that "Without an independent economy, there can be no independent politics." His ideology was further enforced in the National Assembly of 1924; he became a deputy of the people from ex-prefecture of Kosovo. He bravely criticized the bureaucratic system of that time and the ignorance of the governing classes and fiercely defended traditional values and the human rights of the Albanians living in ethnic Albania.

Perception 
Albanians view Avni Rustemi as a National Hero who Fought for the Democratization of Albania and killed the National Traitor Essad Pasha Toptani who would sell out the country to its neighbors.

Films
Avni Rustemi has also been the subject of numerous feature films, in most of them he appears as national hero, who killed the traitor of the nation. Two shots in Paris (:sq:Dy krisma në Paris) is a drama by Sheri Mita, Pëllumb Kulla with the subject of Essad Pasha Toptani's murder in Paris and the trial of Avni Rustemi

External links

1895 births
1924 deaths
People from Libohovë
People from Janina vilayet
Albanian politicians
Albanian republicans
Albanian revolutionaries
Albanian schoolteachers
Assassinated Albanian politicians
Heroes of Albania